Majors & Minors was an American reality television singing competition, that premiered on The Hub on September 23, 2011. Auditions were held for 8-16 year olds, and the winner received a chance to have a partnership with Sony's RCA Music Group. BMI was involved with the series. The winner of the show was Michael Woodard.

Cast

Contestants

Mentors

Majors

Episodes

References

2010s American music television series
2010s American reality television series
2011 American television series debuts
2012 American television series endings
English-language television shows
Talent shows
Television series about children
Television series about teenagers
Television series by Hasbro Studios
Discovery Family original programming